Corymbia papillosa, commonly known as the Maningrida bloodwood, is a species of small, stunted tree that is endemic to northern Australia. It has rough, tessellated bark on the trunk and branches, a crown of thin, oblong to elliptical leaves, flower buds in groups of seven, white flowers and urn-shaped to barrel-shaped fruit.

Description
It has thick, rough, tessellated flaky bark on the trunk and branches. The leaves are densely covered with short, multicellular, hair-like glands. Flowering has been observed in November and the flowers are white.

Taxonomy and naming
Corymbia papillosa was first formally in 1995 by Ken Hill and Lawrie Johnson. The specific epithet (pachycarpa) is from the Latin papilla meaning "a nipple" and -osus, "full of", referring to the papilliform hairs on the leaves.

Distribution and habitat
Maningrida bloodwood grows in flat areas in sandy soils with lateritic gravels and occurs in scattered parts of the Top End of the Northern Territory with isolated occurrence in the Kimberley region of Western Australia.

See also
 List of Corymbia species

References

papillosa
Myrtales of Australia
Rosids of Western Australia
Flora of the Northern Territory
Plants described in 1995